The Molossidae, or free-tailed bats, are a family of bats within the order Chiroptera.
The Molossidae is the fourth-largest family of bats, containing about 110 species as of 2012. They are generally quite robust, and consist of many strong-flying forms with relatively long and narrow wings with wrinkled lips shared through their genus. Their strong flying form allows them to fly 60 miles per hour using tail winds and at altitudes over 10,000 feet. This makes them unique among bats, as they are the only bat family that withstands the elevation. They are widespread, being found on every continent except Antarctica. They are typically found in caves, abandoned mines, or tunnels.

Common ancestry
The family's scientific name comes from the type genus Molossus, which in turn is from the Molossus breed of dogs.

The family's common name is derived from a length of "free" tail, projecting beyond the end of the uropatagium—the membrane that connects the base of the tail to the hind legs.

Another common name for some members of this group, and indeed a few species from other families, is mastiff bat. They are widespread, being found on every continent except Antarctica.

Anatomy
The tail is usually best seen when resting. A special ring of cartilage slides up or down the tail vertebrae by muscular action to stretch or retract the tail membrane. This gives many species a degree of fine tuning in their flight maneuvers to rival their day-flying ecological equivalents, such as swifts, swallows, and martins. As a result, these animals include the fastest-flying of all bat species among their number. The dental formula of free-tailed bats varies between species: 

Free-tailed bats are usually grey, brown, or black in color, with some exceptions. They are insectivorous, and catch their food on the wing. While some species roost in small groups in hollow trees or rocky crevices, some cave-dwelling species form vast colonies of up to 50 million individuals.

Molecular sequence data support the monophyly of the Molossidae as a whole, but not that of many of its genera, such as Chaerephon, Mops, Mormopterus, and Tadarida. The grouping of Chaerephon minus C. jobimena plus Mops was found to be monophyletic, as was Otomops.

Systematics

A 2012 study attempted to show the relationships of genera within the subfamily Molossinae (the other subfamily of Molossidae, Tomopeatinae, only contains the blunt-eared bat).
This study used genetic data to create a phylogeny, which contrasted from previous phylogenies constructed using morphological data.
Traits that were previously used to group species, such as having a flat skull, were shown to have no relation to evolutionary relationship, meaning that flat-headedness evolved multiple times within the family.
Of the 16 genera of Molossinae, 15 were used to create the phylogeny (left), with researchers unable to include Peters's flat-headed bat, the only member of Platymops.

The results of this study showed that Chaerephon is paraphyletic, forming a clade with Mops.
There was strong support for Old World and New World clades.
While the genus Tadarida has one New World species, the Mexican free-tailed bat, the genus itself has its origins in the Old World.
The most recent common ancestor of Tadarida with New World genera was 29 million years ago.
Several tribes have been proposed within the Molossinae.
Ammerman et al. proposed Molossini (containing Molossus, Eumops, Molossops, Cynomops, Neoplatymops, Nyctinomops, and Promops); Tadarini (containing Tadarida, Chaerephon, Mops, Platymops, Sauromys, Myopterus, and Otomops); Cheiromelini (containing Cheiromeles); and Mormopterini (containing Mormopterus)

Classification
The 18 genera contain about 100 species:

FAMILY MOLOSSIDAE
 Genus †Cuvierimops
 Genus †Nyctinomus
 Genus †Potamops
 Genus †Rhizomops
 Genus †Wallia
 Subfamily Molossinae
 Genus Chaerephon – lesser mastiff bats
 Duke of Abruzzi's free-tailed bat, Chaerephon aloysiisabaudiae
 Ansorge's free-tailed bat, Chaerephon ansorgei
 Gland-tailed free-tailed bat, Chaerephon bemmeleni
 Spotted free-tailed bat, Chaerephon bivittata
 Fijian mastiff bat, Chaerephon bregullae
 Chapin's free-tailed bat, Chaerephon chapini
 Gallagher's free-tailed bat, Chaerephon gallagheri
 Northern freetail bat, Chaerephon jobensis
 Black and red free-tailed bat, Chaerephon jobimena
 Northern free-tailed bat, Chaerephon johorensis
 Grandidier's free-tailed bat, Chaerephon leucogaster
 Lappet-eared free-tailed bat, Chaerephon major
 Nigerian free-tailed bat, Chaerephon nigeriae
 Wrinkle-lipped free-tailed bat, Chaerephon plicata
 Little free-tailed bat, Chaerephon pumilus
 Russet free-tailed bat, Chaerephon russata
 Solomons mastiff bat, Chaerephon solomonis
 São Tomé free-tailed bat, Chaerephon tomensis
 Genus Cheiromeles – naked bats, or hairless bats
 Greater naked bat, Cheiromeles torquatus
 Lesser naked bat, Cheiromeles parvidens
 Genus Cynomops
 Cinnamon dog-faced bat, Cynomops abrasus
 Freeman's dog-faced bat, Cynomops freemani
 Greenhall's dog-faced bat, Cynomops greenhalli
 Mexican dog-faced bat, Cynomops mexicanus
 Para dog-faced bat, Cynomops paranus
 Southern dog-faced bat, Cynomops planirostris
 Genus Eumops – mastiff bats, or bonneted bats
 Black bonneted bat, Eumops auripendulus
 Dwarf bonneted bat, Eumops bonariensis
 Big bonneted bat, Eumops dabbenei
 Fierce bonneted bat, Eumops ferox
 Florida bonneted bat, Eumops floridanus
 Wagner's bonneted bat, Eumops glaucinus
 Sanborn's bonneted bat, Eumops hansae
 Guianan bonneted bat, Eumops maurus
 Patagonian bonneted bat, Eumops patagonicus
 Western mastiff bat, Eumops perotis
 Colombian bonneted bat, Eumops trumbulli
 Underwood's bonneted bat, Eumops underwoodi
 Wilson's bonneted bat, Eumops wilsoni
 Genus Mormopterus
 Subgenus Mormopterus
 Natal free-tailed bat, Mormopterus acetabulosus
 Moutou's free-tailed bat, Mormopterus francoismoutoui
 Sumatran mastiff bat, Mormopterus doriae
 Peters's wrinkle-lipped bat, Mormopterus jugularis
 Kalinowski's mastiff bat, Mormopterus kalinowskii
 Little goblin bat, Mormopterus minutus
 Incan little mastiff bat, Mormopterus phrudus
 Subgenus Micronomus
 Beccari's mastiff bat, Mormopterus beccarii
 Bristle-faced free-tailed bat, Mormopterus eleryi
 Loria's mastiff bat, Mormopterus loriae
 East-coast free-tailed bat, Mormopterus norfolkensis
 Southern free-tailed bat, Mormopterus planiceps
 Genus Molossops – broad-faced bats
 Equatorial dog-faced bat, Molossops (Cabreramops) aequatorianus
 Rufous dog-faced bat, Molossops neglectus
 Dwarf dog-faced bat, Molossops temminckii
 Genus Molossus – velvety free-tailed bats
 Alvarez's mastiff bat, Molossus alvarezi
 Aztec mastiff bat, Molossus aztecus
 Barnes' mastiff bat, Molossus barnesi
 Coiban mastiff bat, Molossus coibensis
 Bonda mastiff bat, Molossus currentium
 Velvety free-tailed bat, Molossus molossus
 Miller's mastiff bat, Molossus pretiosus
 Black mastiff bat, Molossus rufus
 Sinaloan mastiff bat, Molossus sinaloae
 Genus Mops – greater mastiff bats
 Subgenus Xiphonycteris
 Spurrell's free-tailed bat, Mops spurrelli
 Dwarf free-tailed bat, Mops nanulus
 Peterson's free-tailed bat, Mops petersoni
 Sierra Leone free-tailed bat, Mops brachypterus
 Bakari's free-tailed bat, Mops bakarii
 Railer bat, Mops thersites
 Subgenus Mops
 Angolan free-tailed bat, Mops condylurus
 White-bellied free-tailed bat, Mops niveiventer
 Mongalla free-tailed bat, Mops demonstrator
 Malayan free-tailed bat, Mops mops
 Sulawesi free-tailed bat, Mops sarasinorum
 Trevor's free-tailed bat, Mops trevori
 Medje free-tailed bat, Mops congicus
 Midas free-tailed bat, Mops midas
 Niangara free-tailed bat, Mops niangarae
 Medje free-tailed bat, Mops congicus
 Malagasy white-bellied free-tailed bat, Mops leucostigma
 Genus Myopterus
 Daubenton's free-tailed bat, Myopterus daubentonii
 Bini free-tailed bat, Myopterus whitleyi
 Genus Nyctinomops – New World free-tailed bats
 Peale's free-tailed bat, Nyctinomops aurispinosus
 Pocketed free-tailed bat, Nyctinomops femorosaccus
 Broad-eared bat, Nyctinomops laticaudatus
 Big free-tailed bat, Nyctinomops macrotis
 Genus Neoplatymops
 Mato Grosso dog-faced bat, Neoplatymops mattogrossensis
 Genus Otomops – big-eared free-tailed bats
 Javan mastiff bat, Otomops formosus
 Johnstone's mastiff bat, Otomops johnstonei
 Madagascar free-tailed bat, Otomops madagascariensis
 Large-eared free-tailed bat, Otomops martiensseni
 Big-eared mastiff bat, Otomops papuensis
 Mantled mastiff bat, Otomops secundus
 Wroughton's free-tailed bat, Otomops wroughtoni
 Genus Platymops
 Peters's flat-headed bat, Platymops setiger
 Genus Promops – domed-palate mastiff bats
 Big crested mastiff bat, Promops centralis
 Brown mastiff bat, Promops nasutus
 Genus Sauromys
 Roberts's flat-headed bat, Sauromys petrophilus
 Genus Tadarida – free-tailed bats
 Egyptian free-tailed bat, Tadarida aegyptiaca
 Mexican free-tailed bat, Tadarida brasiliensis
 Madagascan large free-tailed bat, Tadarida fulminans
 East Asian free-tailed bat, Tadarida insignis
 La Touche's free-tailed bat, Tadarida latouchei
 Kenyan big-eared free-tailed bat, Tadarida lobata
 European free-tailed bat, Tadarida teniotis
 African giant free-tailed bat, Tadarida ventralis
 Genus Austronomus
 White-striped free-tailed bat, Austronomus australis
 New Guinea free-tailed bat, Austronomus kuboriensis
 Subfamily Tomopeatinae
 Genus Tomopeas
 Blunt-eared bat, Tomopeas ravus

References

Further reading
 
 
 

 
Extant Eocene first appearances
Taxa named by Paul Gervais